Manoj is a name of Indian origin. Notable people called Manoj include:

Business
 Manoj Badale (born 1967), Indian businessman
 Manoj Bhargava (born 1953), Indian-American entrepreneur and philanthropist

Education
 Manoj Chitnavis, British teacher and chemist
 Manoj Datta, Indian professor and civil engineer
 Manoj Pant, Indian professor and international trade expert

Film and television
 Manchu Manoj (born 1983), Indian film actor
 M. Night Shyamalan (born 1970), Indian-American filmmaker
 Manoj (film editor), editor of films such as Ivide 
 Manoj Bajpayee (born 1969), also credited as Manoj Bajpai, Indian film actor, predominantly in Bollywood and Telugu films
 Manoj Bharathiraja (born 1976), Tamil film actor
 Manoj Joshi (born 1945), Indian film and television actor
 Manoj K. Jayan (born 1966), Indian actor in Malayalam, Tamil, and Telugu films
 Manoj Kumar (born 1937), Indian actor and director in Bollywood films
 Manoj Kumar (director) (born 1960), who has directed Tamil, Telugu and Kannada language films
 Manoj Mitra (born 1938), Bengali Indian theatre, film and television actor, director and playwright
 Manoj Pahwa (born 1963), Indian film and television actor
 Manoj Paramahamsa, Indian cinematographer, primarily working in Tamil cinema
 Manoj Punj (1970–2006), Punjabi film director
 Manoj Punjabi (born 1972), Indian-Indonesian film and television producer
 Manoj Sharma (born 1973), Indian director, screenwriter, and editor in primarily Hindi and Bhojpuri films
 Manoj Sood (born 1962), Canadian film and television actor
 Manoj Tyagi (born 1974), Indian screenwriter and film director in Hindi cinema

Music
 Maalavika Manoj (born 1993), independent musician and songwriter based in Chennai, Tamil Nadu
 Manoj George, composer and violinist in the Malayalam and Kannada film industries
 Manoj–Gyan, Indian music director duo for Hindi and Tamil language films
 Manoj Tiwari (born 1971), singer, actor, television presenter and music director from Bihar, India

Politics
 K. S. Manoj (born 1965), Kerala politician representing Alapuzha Lok Sabha constituency
 Manoj Chakraborty, West Bengal politician
 Manoj Juneja (born 1960), Indian United Nations official
 Manoj Kumar (Delhi politician)
 Manoj Kumar (politician) (born 1964), Lok Sabha member representing the Palamau

Constituency of Jharkhand
 P. H. Manoj Pandian (born 1971), politician and former Member of the Legislative Assembly
 Manoj Pradhan, Indian politician from the Bharatiya Janata Party
 Manoj Rajoria (born 1969), Indian politician
 Manoj Kumar Singh, Bihar politician
 Manoj Sinha (born 1959), politician representing Ghazipur Lok Sabha constituency

Sports and games
 Manoj Baishya (born 1980), Nepalese cricketer
 Manoj Bhagawati, Indian cricketer
 Manoj Cheruparambil (born 1979), Indian-born Hong Kong cricketer
 Manoj David (born 1975), Sri Lankan cricketer
 Manoj Hemaratne (born 1969), Sri Lankan cricketer
 Manoj Joglekar (born 1973), Indian cricketer
 Manoj Katuwal (born 1985), Nepalese cricketer
 Manoj Kumar (boxer) (born 1986), Indian welterweight boxer
 Manoj Kumar (chess player) (born 1977), Fijian chess champion
 Manoj Parmar (born 1967), Indian cricketer
 Manoj Tiwary (born 1985), Indian cricketer
 Manoj Prabhakar (born 1963), Indian cricketer
 Manoj Rodrigo (born 1983), Sri Lankan cricketer
 Manoj Thonipurakkal Manoharan (born 1991), Indian footballer

Writing
 Manoj Das (1934–2021), Indian writer in Oriya and English
 Manoj Gupta (born 1967), Indian publisher and editor
 Manoj Joshi (journalist), Indian journalist and author
 Manoj Khanderia (1943–2003), poet and ghazalkaar of Gujarati Literature
 Manoj Kuroor (born 1971), Malayalam poet and lyricist

Other people
 Manoj Kumar Pandey (1975–1999), Indian Army officer, recipient of the Param Vir Chakra
 Manoj Pande (civil servant), Indian civil servant (IRPS) and Member Staff of Railway Board
 Manoj Pande (general), Indian Army general

Sanskrit-language names